Peter Robbins may refer to:

 Peter Robbins (actor) (1956–2022), American child actor
 Peter Robbins (author) (born 1946), British author
 Peter Robbins (rugby union) (1933–1987), England rugby union player
 Pete Robbins (born 1978), American saxophonist and composer